Stanley Humphries may refer to:

Stanley H. Humphries (born 1969), American politician
Stanley Humphries Secondary School, high school in Castlegar, British Columbia, Canada

See also
Stan Humphries (born 1965), American football player